"Unexpected" is a song by German recording artist Sandy. It was written by Pete Martin, Steve Lee, and Tina Harris, and recorded for her debut solo album, Unexpected (2004), while production was helmed by the former. A remix version of the uptempo song, featuring additional vocals from German rapper Manuell and produced by Mark Tabak, Ismail Boulaghmal, and Jan van der Toorn for 3Kings Productions, was released as the album's third and final single in February 2005. Also serving as Rhineland-Palatinate's entry at the Bundesvision Song Contest 2005, where it eventually finished last, "Unexpected" reached the top thirty of the German Singles Chart.

Track listings

Charts

Weekly charts

References

2005 singles
2004 songs
Polydor Records singles
Songs written by Tina Harris
Songs written by Steve Lee (songwriter)